The Clarks Wood Company warehouse is a 19th-century industrial building in Silverthorne Lane, Bristol.

It dates from about 1863, but only two of its original walls remain. It is known to have been used early in its history as a railhead warehouse for William Butler's tar works at nearby Crew's Hole, and later became part of St Vincent's Works.

It is an example of the Bristol Byzantine style of architecture, and has been listed by English Heritage as a grade II listed building.

References

Warehouses in England
Industrial buildings completed in 1863
Grade II listed buildings in Bristol
Grade II listed industrial buildings
Brick buildings and structures
Byzantine Revival architecture in the United Kingdom